Shekar Narasimhan is an Indian American entrepreneur, community leader and political activist. He is the Chairman and Founder of the AAPI Victory Fund, one of the first of its kind SuperPac’s focused exclusively on building the political power of the Asian American Pacific Islander community (AAPI). In his business life, Shekar is the Managing Partner at Beekman Advisors which provides strategic advisory services to companies and investors involved in real estate, mortgage finance, affordable housing and related sectors. Shekar is a Co-Founder for the Remergent Communities Fund, an Opportunity Zone Fund, focusing on small towns and cities in the Southeast U.S. He also serves as Chairman of Papillon Capital, focused on sustainable infrastructure investing. Prior to Beekman Advisors, Shekar Narasimhan was a Managing Director of Prudential Mortgage Capital Company, one of the nation’s leading providers of commercial mortgage financing. Immediately prior to Shekar’s time at Prudential, he was Chairman & CEO of the WMF Group, a publicly traded, commercial mortgage financial services company. WMF was one of the largest such firms in the country before being acquired by Prudential in 2000.

Shekar is currently serving on the boards of Broadstone Net Lease, Inc., Enterprise Community Partners, Inc. and the Democracy Alliance. He is on the Economic Advisory Council for the Center for American Progress and is a member of the Urban Institute’s Policy Leadership Council. He has served on many boards, including the Low Income Investment Fund, the Community Preservation and Development Corporation, the National Housing Conference and the National Multi Housing Council. He is a sought-after speaker on housing finance and affordable housing and is considered a leading expert on rental housing issues in the United States.

Shekar was appointed by Governor Terry McAuliffe and Governor Ralph Northam of Virginia as a Commissioner for the Virginia Housing Development Authority and is currently serving as its Chairman. Previously, he also served as a Member of the Board for Housing and Community Development in Virginia, and as a Commissioner on President Obama’s Advisory Commission on Asian Americans and Pacific Islanders. He was on the founding board of Indiaspora, a nonprofit organization founded by community leaders to unite Indian Americans and to transform their success into meaningful impact in India and on the global stage. He was also Co-Founder of Upakar Foundation, a higher education scholarship fund.

Shekar has served several terms on the Mortgage Bankers Association of America (MBA) Board of Directors, was the first Chair of the MBA’s Commercial/Multifamily Board of Governors, and founded its Multifamily Steering Committee. He was elected as the first Chair of the Fannie Mae DUS Advisory Committee.

Politics 
He is noted for participating in many political campaigns, and supported Jim Webb's election to the Senate. Previously, Shekar co-chaired the Democratic National Committee's Indo-American Council. He was a CEO of The WMF Group Ltd., a publicly traded fund group. As the father of S.R. Sidarth, he participated in the outcry over the controversial "Macaca" comment made regarding Sidarth by former Governor George Allen.

References 

American people of Indian descent
American businesspeople
American Hindus
Living people
Year of birth missing (living people)